General Eyre Challoner Henry Massey, 4th Baron Clarina,  (29 April 1830 – 16 December 1897) was a British Army officer who became colonel of the Durham Light Infantry.

Military career
Massey was commissioned as an ensign in the 68th Light Infantry on 8 October 1847. He saw action with the 95th Regiment of Foot during the Crimean War and, having been promoted to major on 17 November 1857, commanded his regiment during operations to quell the Indian Rebellion of 1857. He went on to be General Officer Commanding Dublin District in 1881. He also became colonel of the Durham Light Infantry and served as a Representative peer for Ireland between 1888 and 1897.

Arms

References

British Army generals
1830 births
1897 deaths
Companions of the Order of the Bath
Irish representative peers
Barons in the Peerage of Ireland